Fatma Zohra Zamoum (born 19 January 1967) is a Franco-Algerian writer, filmmaker and educator.

Biography
Zamoun was born in Bordj Menaïel in the north of Algeria, within a well-known family whose ancestors are Omar ben Zamoum and Mohamed ben Zamoum. After attending the Fine Arts School in Algiers (1985–1988), she went to Paris where she graduated in Cinematography and Audiovisual Studies from the Sorbonne in 1995. She divides her time between Algiers and Paris, pursuing her principal interests, painting, fiction and the cinema.

Z'har (2009) is Zamoun's first feature film, depicting scenes from the violence Algiers experienced in the 1990s. In 2005, she directed the short fiction film La Pelote de Laine and has also authored several books including Comment j'ai fumé tous mes livres (2006). In 2011, she directed and produced a second feature film Kedach Ethabni (Combien tu m'aimes) which tells the story of how little Adel copes with a period spent with his grandmother after his parents break up.
She directed and produced since then "Azib Zamoum, A story About Land", in 2014  And in 2019, she achieved a low budget fiction film named PARKOUR(S) and an unreleased documentary: Body + Art.

Works
 1995: Photos de voyages, documentary
 1996: Leçon de choses, documentary
 1999: À tous ceux qui partent, novel 
 2003: Le Vingtième Siècle dans la peinture algérienne, historical work and expertise
 2004: La Maison de Roy Azdak, documentary
 2005: La Pelote de laine, documentary
 2006: Comment j'ai fumé tous mes livres, novel
 2009: Z'har (Un)Lucky, experimental film
 2009: Le Docker noir, documentary
 2012: Kedach Ethabni or How Big Is Your Love'', feature film
 2014 : "Azib Zamoum, A story About Land", docu drama for Tv and cinema
 2019 : "PARKOUR(S), a feature length fiction
 2019 : BODY + ART, a documentary feature length

See also
 Omar ben Zamoum
 Mohamed ben Zamoum

References

External links

1967 births
Living people
People from Bordj Menaïel
People from Bordj Menaïel District
People from Boumerdès Province
Kabyle people
Algerian film directors
Algerian women film directors
Algerian screenwriters
Algerian women writers
Algerian writers
French women writers
French film directors
French women film directors
Algerian educators
French educators
21st-century Algerian people